The Florida Complex League Marlins are a Rookie-level affiliate of the Miami Marlins, competing in the Florida Complex League of Minor League Baseball. Prior to the 2021 season, the team was known as the Gulf Coast League Marlins. The team plays its home games in Jupiter, Florida, at Roger Dean Stadium, which is also the spring training home of the St. Louis Cardinals and the Miami Marlins. The team is mainly composed of players who are in their first year of professional baseball either as draftees or non-drafted free agents.

History
The team first entered the Gulf Coast League (GCL) in 1984, and has competed continuously since then. The team was based in Kissimmee, Florida, during 1992–1993 and Melbourne, Florida, during 1994–2001. The team has won multiple division titles, but has yet to capture a league championship.

The GCL Marlins threw a combined perfect game against the GCL Astros on July 19, 2012. Justin Jackson pitched the first six innings, Patrick Merkling pitched the seventh inning and Dane Stone pitched the last two innings.

Prior to the 2021 season, the Gulf Coast League was renamed as the Florida Complex League (FCL).

Season-by-season

Roster

References

External links
 Official website

Baseball teams established in 1992
Florida Complex League teams
Professional baseball teams in Florida
Miami Marlins minor league affiliates
Sports in the Miami metropolitan area
1992 establishments in Florida